"Somethin' 'Bout You Baby I Like" is a popular song written by guitarist Richard Supa in the early 1970s. The version by Tom Jones reached No. 36 in the UK in 1974. Glen Campbell and Rita Coolidge reached No. 42 in the US with their recording of the song in 1980.

Chart history
Tom Jones

Trini Lopez

Glen Campbell & Rita Coolidge

Status Quo cover 

"Something 'Bout You Baby I Like" was covered as a single by the British Rock band Status Quo in 1981. It was included on the album Never Too Late.

The version by Glen Campbell and Rita Coolidge prompted Francis Rossi of Status Quo to cover the song. The picture sleeve for the band's version was available in three different colour schemes - full multi-colour, blue print and red print. The majority of the 150,000 sleeves printed were the intended 'full colour' print.

Track listing 
 "Something 'Bout You Baby I Like" (Richard Supa) (2.50)
 "Enough Is Enough" (Francis Rossi, Bernie Frost, Rick Parfitt) (2.52)

Charts

Other cover versions
 Trini Lopez in 1975 (U.S. Cash Box #76)
 Jerry Reed in 1977 on his album Rides Again
 Billy Scott and Janice Barnett (Beach music artists) in 1995

References 

1974 songs
1974 singles
1975 singles
1980 singles
1981 singles
Vertigo Records singles
Parrot Records singles
Decca Records singles
Private Stock Records singles
Capitol Records singles
Tom Jones (singer) songs
Trini Lopez songs
Glen Campbell songs
Rita Coolidge songs
Status Quo (band) songs
Songs written by Richard Supa
Male–female vocal duets